Fritzie Abadi (1915 – 2001) was an American painter, sculptor, and collage artist. Born in Aleppo, which was then part of the Ottoman Empire.

Biography 
The daughter of a rabbi, Abadi lived in Palestine until she was nine years old. She then emigrated to New York City in 1924. She won a drawing competition while attending Bay Ridge High School, and this fostered an early interest in art. She married at eighteen and moved to Oklahoma City, giving birth to two daughters and "forgot about art".  In 1945 she returned to Brooklyn, and in 1946 she enrolled in the Art Students League of New York; there she studied under Nahum Tschacbasov.

Her work is included in several museum collections such as the Butler Institute of American Art, the Evansville Museum of Arts and Science, the Slater Memorial Museum, and the Georgia Museum of Art. She has also exhibited in many venues throughout her career.

She has also received several awards including the Acrylic Painting Award of the National Association of Women Artists (1974) and the Box Assemblage Award from the American Society of Contemporary Artists (1979). She was a member of both institutions, serving on the board of the former in 1970 and as president of the latter from 1970 to 1972; she was on the board of the New York Society of Women Artists in 1980, and was also a member of Women in the Arts and the Hudson River Contemporary Artists. A small collection of documentary material is owned by the Archives of American Art.

Artworks 

 Orange Sky, acrylic, 20" x 16", 1974

References

1915 births
2001 deaths
20th-century American painters
20th-century American sculptors
20th-century American women artists
21st-century American painters
21st-century American sculptors
21st-century American women artists
American collage artists
Women collage artists
People from Aleppo
American people of Syrian-Jewish descent
Mandatory Palestine emigrants to the United States
Painters from New York City
Art Students League of New York alumni
Sculptors from New York (state)